Janet Biehl (born September 4, 1953) is an American author, copyeditor, translator, and artist. She authored several books and articles associated with social ecology, the body of ideas developed and publicized by Murray Bookchin. Formerly an advocate of his antistatist political program, she broke with it publicly in 2011 and now identifies as a progressive Democrat. 

Since the early 1980s she has earned her living as a freelance copyeditor for New York book publishers including Random House, Knopf Doubleday, W.W. Norton, and Farrar Straus & Giroux. She is also a graphic artist and illustrator.

Education 
Biehl grew up in Cincinnati, Ohio, and attended Wesleyan University, graduating in 1974 as a theater major.  She studied acting as well as set and costume design at the Eugene O'Neill Theater Center. She then moved to New York City, where she appeared in off-off-Broadway productions, including the world premiere of Fefu and Her Friends by Maria Irene Fornes. 

Biehl studied drawing and watercolor painting at the Art Students League of New York. In 1985 she enrolled at the CUNY Graduate Center, where she earned an M.A. in liberal studies.

Social ecology 
In 1986 she attended the Institute for Social Ecology, in Vermont, where she met the social theorist Murray Bookchin. In January 1987 she moved to Burlington, Vermont, to study further with Bookchin. They began a collaborative relationship to develop and promote social ecology.

From 1987 to 2003 they co-wrote and co-published the theoretical newsletter Green Perspectives, later renamed Left Green Perspectives. Biehl edited and compiled The Murray Bookchin Reader (1997), which Bookchin considered to be the best introduction to his work. To summarize Bookchin's ideas on assembly democracy, known as libertarian municipalism, she wrote The Politics of Social Ecology:  Libertarian Municipalism (1998). She wrote numerous articles about or related to Bookchin's ideas.

After Bookchin's death in 2006, she spent several years researching and writing Ecology or Catastrophe: The Life of Murray Bookchin. It was published in 2015 by Oxford University Press. In 2011 Biehl separated from social ecology, explaining that she could no longer advocate an antistatist ideology.

Kurdish freedom movement 
After the Kurdish freedom movement leader Abdullah Öcalan, leader of the insurgent Kurdistan Workers' Party, was captured and imprisoned in 1999, he became an avid reader of Bookchin's work in Turkish translation and recommended it to the movement. Drawing in part on Bookchin's ideas, he formulated democratic confederalism as a political program, which the PKK adopted. In 2004 several intermediaries tried to arrange a dialogue between Bookchin and Öcalan but were unsuccessful due to Bookchin's failing health. 

In 2011 Biehl attended and spoke at a conference in Diyarbakir hosted by the Mesopotamian Ecology Movement. That marked the beginning of her involvement with the Kurdish movement.

In 2012 Biehl translated (from German to English) the book Democratic Autonomy in North Kurdistan by the solidarity group TATORT Kurdistan. The book is a field study of democratic institutions built by the Kurdish movement in southeastern Turkey to implement democratic confederalism.

In 2014 and 2015, she visited Rojava, the multiethnic region of northeastern Syria where many Kurds live and where the Kurdish movement implemented democratic confederalism, gender equality, and ecology.  Both times she was part of a delegation of observers to witness the social changes under way there. She published several articles about her visits.

She then translated (German to English) Revolution in Rojava: Democratic Autonomy and Women's Liberation in Northern Syria, written by Michael Knapp, Anja Flach, and Ercan Ayboga. This early broad field study of the revolution was published in October 2016 by Pluto Press. 

Thereafter she translated two volumes of the memoir of Sakine Cansız, a co-founder of the PKK in 1978 and progenitor of today's strong Kurdish women's movement.They were published as SARA by Pluto Press. 

In the spring of 2019 Biehl returned to Rojava to participate in a documentary film about the social revolution underway there. She wrote and drew about the experience in her graphic memoir Their Blood Got Mixed: Revolutionary Rojava and the War on ISIS, which was published by PM Press in 2022. The film, Road to Rojava, will be released in 2023.

In 2022 she collaborated with Emek Ergun and Ruken Isik to coordinate the English translation (from Turkish) of The Purple Color of Kurdish Politics, a multiauthor book about women's struggle for equality in the Kurdish party tradition, as well as women's transformation of that tradition. The book was edited by Gültan Kışanak while in a Turkish prison and was published in Turkish. The English translation was published by Pluto Press. 

As of 2023 Biehl is the website content editor for the New York Kurdish Cultural Center as well as for the Alliance Française of the Lake Champlain Region.

Selected works 
 
 
 (Editor), 
 
 
 (Translator), 
 
 (Translator), 
 (Translator), 
 (Translator), 
 (Author and illustrator), 
 (Translation co-coordinator, illustrator),

References

External links
 Sketchery
 Correspondence between Bookchin and Abdullah Öcalan

1953 births
American political writers
Living people
Social ecology (Bookchin)